On 10 March 2009, a Liberation Tigers of Tamil Eelam suicide bomber caused an explosion at a religious parade near Godapitiya Jumma mosque in Akuressa, Matara in southern Sri Lanka, killing 14 and injuring 35 civilians. Several government ministers were among the injured including oil resource minister A. H. M. Fowzie, telecommunication minister Mahinda Wijesekara, Mahinda Yapa Abeywardena, Pandu Bandaranaike, Chandrasiri Gajadeera, and Ali Ameer. Also, there were few local politicians among the dead.

As a result of the police investigations on the incident, the LTTE suicide bomber was identified as Senthamil by his girlfriend at the Matara Hospital mortuary.

The explosion was caught on a video footage filmed by a local resident.

References

External links
 Akuressa Attack Video caught on tape

2009 crimes in Sri Lanka
Attacks on civilians attributed to the Liberation Tigers of Tamil Eelam
Massacres in Sri Lanka
Filmed assassinations
Liberation Tigers of Tamil Eelam attacks in Eelam War IV
Mass murder in 2009
Suicide bombings in Sri Lanka
Terrorist incidents in Sri Lanka in 2009
March 2009 events in Asia
Attacks on parades